Extremis is a six-issue story arc from the comic book series Iron Man (vol. 4), published in issues one through six in 2005 and 2006 by Marvel Comics. It was written by Warren Ellis and illustrated by Adi Granov. Extremis elevates the status quo for Iron Man, increasing the power of his armor significantly.

Extremis received mostly positive reviews, and it is often listed as one of the best Iron Man stories. Elements of Extremis were adapted for the 2008 film Iron Man, and the Iron Man: Armored Adventures episode "Extremis," and the storyline serves as the primary source material for the 2013 film Iron Man 3.

Production
Extremis was the second story arc after the "Avengers Disassembled" crossover event, not to be confused with "Stark: Disassembled", a later story in The Invincible Iron Man.

The story was meant as a sort of "new start" for the character—to redefine him from his origins as an arms dealer, to be the "test pilot for the future" Ellis intended him to be. The story rarely mentions any of Iron Man's past, and references to the rest of the Marvel universe are limited to brief, passing mentions of the Avengers and Fin Fang Foom. Warren Ellis admitted he had intentionally not read any Iron Man material besides the very earliest issues.

This is similar for Adi Granov: "My first official introduction to the character occurred a year prior to Extremis. [...] Upon reading the script, I realized how realistic Warren's approach was to the story. [...] When illustrating the book I wanted my art to mirror the realism in Warren's writing [...] I felt that Warren wrote a story that's a sort of techno-thriller action story and I wanted the art to reflect this. [...] I saw Iron Man as not just a superhero in a suit; rather he is a pilot or weapon. To me, the Iron Man armor is more akin to a jet fighter than it is to an outfit.

The story, which lasts about three to four days in comic book time, takes place at an undefined time after the founding of the New Avengers and before the Stamford catastrophe (which led to the Marvel Civil War).

Story

Tony Stark is a weapons designer whose weapons are being used against Al Qaeda in Afghanistan in the years just prior to the second Gulf War. He is injured during an inspection tour when one of his own bombs detonates, sending a piece of shrapnel into his chest, and is captured by Afghan terrorists. As in the original origin story, Tony creates his first suit of armor with Ho Yinsen and escapes the terrorists, with Yinsen killed during the escape.

Three men enter a disused slaughterhouse in Texas, where two of them inject a willing third, whom they call "Mallen". This injection contains an experimental drug which makes him fall to the floor in immense pain. A bizarre physical change overtakes him; his horrified compatriots flee the room, locking him in.

Miles underground in his Coney Island "garage", Stark is awakened from sleep and several weeks of work, isolation, and diminished self care by his secretary's phone call, reminding him of a scheduled interview with a journalist. During the interview, it emerges that Stark deeply regrets that the world-changing, humanitarian improvements he had hoped to fund with his weapons sales have not yet materialized. Confronted by his regrets, Stark returns to the garage, takes stock of himself while realizing that the Iron Man is likely his key to a better future for both himself and humanity. Having canceled all appointments, Tony Stark dons the newest version of the Iron Man armor and takes off into the sky.

Meanwhile, the injected man's body, still lying in the Bastrop warehouse, is now covered completely in a bizarre layer of scar tissue.

Later, at Futurepharm Corporation offices in Austin, Texas, Dr. Aldrich Killian commits suicide after typing and printing his confession. The note informs co-worker Maya Hansen that he has stolen and "loosed" the company's dangerous Extremis serum for some "greater" purpose. Hansen calls Tony Stark, whom she met years ago at a meeting of the minds.

Back in the Texas slaughterhouse, the two men return to find Mallen almost completely recovered in appearance. He is alive, having almost punched through the locked metal door.

Stark arrives in Texas in the middle of a teleconference with his board of directors, rejecting their requests that he resign as CEO of his company and take a head technician title instead. Tony also argues that Stark Industries, having invented a revolutionary cell phone and connection method, no longer needs the government's funding. The conference ends at a crossroad. Arriving at Futurepharm, Stark learns that the intended receiver of the Extremis dose is currently unknown due to an inability to hack Killian's computer. Using Stark Industry's new prototype phone, Tony emails Killian's entire hard drive to be hacked by one of his employees, and, to distract Maya, jets her and himself to San Diego to talk with their old friend and teacher, Sal Kennedy.

Meanwhile, the three men from the slaughterhouse arrive at the FBI field office. While Kennedy, now a futurist following nature and an idealistic way of life, harangues Tony and Maya on their military work and thus-far-failed promise, Mallen sets the FBI office on fire using his new biological powers.  Maya catches the story on the news, realizing that the terrorists are in fact using Extremis and causing casualties of over 50 civilians.  Back in the van, Mallen tells his compatriots that he is only getting started.

In flight back to Texas, Maya tells Stark Extremis is a military nanotechnology serum that was another attempt to recreate the Captain America Super-Soldier Serum, and that the new formula interfaces with the brain's 'repair center' and directs the body to rebuild itself from scratch as if it were all wound tissue to be replaced. Stark receives a call from his employee, which reveals that Killian gave Extremis to local terrorists. Realizing the threat, Tony drops Maya off at Futurepharm, and departs.

Iron Man tracks the terrorists' van from above via body heat scans and tears it in half with a non-lethal repulsor ray. Mallen instantly recovers, and after refusing to surrender peacefully, engages Iron Man in a brutal fight. Throughout the battle, it becomes obvious that Mallen's new abilities far surpass the processing speed and durability of Iron Man's armor. Suffering severe injuries and damage to his armor, Iron Man and the police manage to repulse Mallen, though civilian casualties are present. Mallen flees, leaving Stark trapped beneath a burning car with his armor at zero power. Stark saves himself and the car's passengers by raising his armor to 1% power by drawing from the flames' thermal energy, though he is forced to rely on the police to remove the car from atop his body.

Iron Man calls Maya and has her people fly him to Futurepharm, where, in a private medical bay, he reveals himself as Tony Stark to Maya. Knowing the severity of his injuries, Tony realizes the only way for him to survive and defeat Mallen is to become one with the Iron Man by taking the Extremis serum himself. Maya gives Tony a lower dose of the serum that will not alter his mind and body as it did for Mallen.  Unknown to Maya, Tony had altered the structure of the Extremis dose, removing several safeties and linking himself to his armor and machinery. Tony falls into a coma as a cocoon forms around his body.

While unconscious, Stark relives his story as Iron Man, starting with his first mortal injury and the secrets he revealed to Yinsen while they constructed the original Arc Reactor (used to still the shrapnel lodged in Stark's chest and prevent it from puncturing his heart) and Iron Man suit (something powered by the same thing keeping him alive that would allow for the two of them to escape their captors). Tony confesses that the terrorists could not be allowed to use his weapons, and that his Military contracts were nothing more than "stealing money from the government" to fund something that would better all of mankind and bring a better future; the Iron Man idea was never a weapon of war, but the start of a process that would merge men with machines and make humanity great.

Twenty-four hours into his coma, the cocoon which has covered his body bursts; Stark awakens, healed and newly fit. An internal control sheath for his Iron Man armor is now contained within the hollows of his bones, able to emerge upon mental command. He can integrate himself not only into his armor, but phone, computer, and even satellite networks. Maya confronts Tony on the potential strain his organs will suffer, only to find that the Extremis formula allowed him to grow entirely new organs. Using an older version of the Iron Man suit stored in a suit case, Tony explains that the autonomous armor was the way of the future, though its low processing speed made it useless until now.

Tapping into a satellite cluster, Iron Man finds Mallen heading towards Washington, intent on killing the president. Having the police evacuate the city, Iron Man confronts Mallen. During the fight, Iron Man reveals several aspects of his past, saying that he was forced to kill nearly 50 people in order to escape the terrorists and save himself and his friend, only to witness a stray bullet kill Yinsen on impact. Mallen replies that his parents died the same way. Tony points out that when Mallen killed 50 people, he did so with no knowledge of who or what they were, and did so twenty years after the fact. Now superior to Mallen, Iron Man explains that he had to be the one to stop the terrorist, seeing Mallen as a perversion of himself: a man with power but no concern for or ability to see the future. In the end, Mallen refuses to listen, pins Stark to the ground, and violently declares, "There isn't any future. I'm gonna kill it!" Seeing the horror before him, Stark fires his unibeam, piercing Mallen's chest and tearing his organs apart. Enraged by the man's refusal to give up, as well as his contempt for all life, Iron Man grabs Mallen's head with both hands and blows it off with a double blast of his repulsor rays. Attempting to recover, Mallen's body rises onto its knees, only to collapse lifeless on the ground. Furious, Iron Man condemns Mallen for what he made him do. Recovering from the incident, Stark declares that he has one last thing to do: the worst part yet.

Confronting Maya at Futurepharm, Iron Man reveals that Maya was clearly Killian's accomplice, due to the issue of needing two key cards entered at the same time as well as her extensive involvement with the formula. Maya allows herself to be taken away, though she justifies her actions by comparing the Extremis serum to the Atom Bomb, saying, "It had to be used once in anger so that it would never be used in anger again."  Maya then declares that Tony is no better than she is, to which Iron Man replies, "No. But I'm trying to be... And tomorrow I'll be able to look myself in the mirror."

The Extremis virus
Extremis is referred to as a "virus" throughout the story. The verbatim description offered by its inventor Maya Hansen, goes: "...Extremis is a super-soldier solution. It's a bio-electronics package, fitted into a few billion graphite nanotubes and suspended in a carrier fluid. A magic bullet, like the original super-soldier serum—all fitted into a single injection. It hacks the body's repair center—the part of the brain that keeps a complete blue print of the human body. When we're injured, we refer to that area of the brain to heal properly. Extremis rewrites the repair center. In the first stage, the body essentially becomes an open wound. The normal human blueprint is being replaced with the Extremis blueprint. The brain is being told the body is wrong. Extremis protocol dictates that the subject be placed on life support and intravenously fed nutrients at this point. For the next two or three days, the patient remains unconscious within a cocoon of scabs. (...) Extremis uses the nutrients and body mass to grow new organs. Better ones..."

Effects of the Extremis process, apart from the changes specific to Tony Stark, included: greatly accelerated healing; immensely-boosted immune system; generation of "new, improved organs" (Tony's cardiovascular and respiratory systems were greatly upgraded); and, the side effect of increased aggressiveness. Tony Stark had the super-powers removed from the Extremis compiler, though, effectively 'exchanging' them for the ability to interface directly with machines and his own armor. But Mallen retained said super-powers, resulting in his high-level super-strength, super-speed, advanced invulnerability, and the abilities to breathe fire and project arcs of electricity from his hands, as well as being bullet-proof.

As well as the obvious physical changes, Extremis also affected Stark mentally, allowing him to process information extraordinarily quickly, on a subconscious level, to help him better cope with the direct technological link he now possessed to his armor (even as his standard thought processes remained at a human norm). As a result, his brain, taking in more information than he could consciously process, began to sublimate it into his unconscious mind, causing Stark to experience occasional hallucinations of particularly relevant information, manifesting as people whose deaths he felt personally responsible for, such as Captain America or Happy Hogan. These hallucinations served to make him aware of facts that he had noted subconsciously while not recognizing their relevance or existence on a conscious level, such as that a member of the Initiative had lied about his powers (he claimed to just have superhuman physical abilities when he actually manipulated gravity to create the appearance of superstrength, as otherwise he couldn't be given an IV while in hospital as he would have had invulnerable skin), or that Maya Hansen was actually alive after her death was faked. Doc Samson speculated that the hallucinations appeared because the excess information was filtered into the same place Stark subconsciously stored his guilt to stop himself facing it.

When the Mandarin attempts to release Extremis on a large scale as part of his plan to 'reshape' the human race, it is revealed that Maya's initial version of Extremis can only be successful when used on people who possess a rare genetic sequence, found in only 2.5% of the human population. This percentage includes Tony Stark and Maya Hansen, but does not include the Mandarin. Anyone without this sequence who is exposed to Extremis will be killed by it.

When industrialist Michael Hall attempts to create his own suits of armor based on the Carnage symbiote, Iron Man attempts to hack the suits, but Carnage is able to 'hack' Iron Man in return by using the technological/biological interface elements of Extremis.

Legacy
During the 2010 "Stark: Disassembled" storyline, Tony is forced to erase portions of his memory in order to prevent Norman Osborn from gaining access to the list of people registered under the Superhuman Registration Act. These actions resulted in his falling into a persistent vegetative state, in which his brain is unable to even regulate the autonomic functions of his body. During this period, Stark's colleagues play a recorded holographic message from Tony, which reveal that when the extraterrestrial Skrulls invaded Earth during the 2008 "Secret Invasion" storyline, they attacked Tony's Extremis, permanently shutting it down. Stark's mind is "rebooted" using information that he had saved when he first injected himself with Extremis, with the result that he loses all memory of the actions he had committed after receiving the Extremis upgrade, although he has spent time researching his activities between then and his restoration. Tony later discovers that his brain still has access to Extremis, which he began using again.

During the 2012 "Believe" story arc, Tony learns that Maya Hansen has been killed and various new versions of Extremis have been released onto the black market, prompting him to track them down and eliminate them.

The Extremis virus is then remade by Tony's long-lost foster brother, Arno Stark.

When Bruce Banner is shot in the head by the Ancient Order of the Shield, with his usual healing factor making an erratic job of reconstructing Banner's mind even if it can repair the physical damage, Stark is able to use Extremis to heal the damage to Banner's brain and restore him to full mental health without any of the usual side effects or powers. However, during the 2014 "Original Sin" storyline, when exposure to Uatu's eye after his murder causes Banner and Stark to remember that Stark had tampered with the original gamma bomb and was thus indirectly responsible for Banner's transformation into the Hulk, Banner uses a modified Extremis to trigger his transformation into the Hulk while retaining his intellect to ensure his revenge on Stark. Even after the two recognize that Tony's actions actually saved Bruce's life, Bruce modifies Extremis to modify his usual transformation, creating a new Hulk persona known as "Doc Green" (a form of Hulk that is similar to Bruce Banner's Merged Hulk form) who retains Bruce's intellect and the Hulk's strength. After Doc Green attacked and depowered other gamma mutants as he believed that they were a threat, the Hulk then asked Shadowcat for help to remove the physical components of the Extremis virus from his brain, eliminating a tumour that may have killed him but furthering Doc Green's development into what appears to be a contemporary incarnation of the Maestro. However, Doc Green eventually realised that his current state was only temporary and he would eventually return to normal, but an A.I. he created to facilitate his efforts at finding a cure has begun to work against him by using more Maestro-esque tactics, with Doc Green declining the option of a new Extremis upgrade for fear of becoming a new Maestro.

During the 2014 "AXIS" storyline, Tony Stark experienced a moral inversion due to the Scarlet Witch making a mistake while trying to bring out Professor X in the new Red Onslaught, he experienced a new surge of his more negative traits such as his ego, irresponsibility, and alcoholism, culminating in him releasing a new version of Extremis onto San Francisco. This new version, known as the Extremis 3.0 app, could offer beauty, health or even immortality for free, but Tony subsequently ended the free trial mode and started charging the app in a daily fee basis, making the citizens desperate, prompting Pepper Potts, Daredevil, and an artificial intelligence based on Tony's mind stored in an old Iron Man armor to make plans to stop him, based on Tony's past requests that his allies be prepared if he should ever cross a line. During the fight between Daredevil and Iron Man, Extremis is used by Iron Man to "infect" Daredevil with it which enabled him to see again. Daredevil subsequently realized that Stark had added the Extremis virus to San Francisco's water supply, with the phones simply transmitting a subsonic signal that activated the already-existing virus in their bodies, but Stark subjected Matt to minor brain damage to erase his memories of this discovery, intending to reprogram the activation signal to a frequency Daredevil cannot detect. This plan was ended when Pepper Potts exposed Tony's true feelings about the world after his inversion.

Following the eight months ellipsis after 2015 "Secret Wars", Tony Stark has returned to his normal self with no signs of his moral inversion personality. The status of the Extremis virus remains unknown.

Reception
Extremis received favorable reviews and is often listed as one of the best Iron Man stories.

In other media

Television
 The Extremis mini-series was loosely adapted as an Iron Man: Armored Adventures episode of the same name. In the episode, the Extremis formula is retconned as an attempt to recreate the super-soldier serum behind Captain America's powers. Mallen, an ex-agent of S.H.I.E.L.D. rather than a terrorist, injects himself with the formula after being fired by Nick Fury, and badly injures Iron Man during their initial encounter. In response, Tony injects himself with a modified version of the Extremis formula, allowing him to fully interface with his armor, along with all other forms of technology, and defeat Mallen. According to Andros Stark in the episode "Iron Man 2099", everyone has an upgraded version of Extremis by 2099 while he is running version 16.5, named J.A.R.V.I.S.
 The Extremis serum appears in the Marvel Cinematic Universe TV series Agents of S.H.I.E.L.D., continuing plot threads from Iron Man 3. The pilot episode introduces Michael Peterson (J. August Richards), a former factory worker who was injected by Hydra branch, Project Centipede, with an experimental serum created from the Extremis combined with Chitauri metal, gamma radiation, and an attempted recreation of Captain America's super-soldier serum. In "Girl in the Flower Dress", Project Centipede attempts to improve the serum by experimenting on pyrokinetic street performer Chan Ho Yi; during which they harvest his blood platelets to stabilize Extremis' unstable elements. With this success, Centipede operative Raina (portrayed Ruth Negga) reports back to her superior, the "Clairvoyant". In "T.A.H.I.T.I." and "Ragtag", Phil Coulson's team discover S.H.I.E.L.D. turncoat John Garrett is the Clairvoyant as well as his and Project Centipede's connections to Hydra after learning Centipede's research was meant for restoring his failing cybernetic implants. Raina combines the Centipede serum with the Kree-based GH-325 serum to stabilize Garrett, thought it comes at the cost of his sanity.

Film
 Iron Man's armor and origin as depicted in the 2008 Marvel Cinematic Universe film Iron Man closely resemble those introduced in Extremis. Based on his work on the story arc, artist Adi Granov was brought on as a producer for the film, who went on to create the final designs for Iron Man's armor. "Extremis and Beyond" is included as a special feature on the DVD release. In other featurettes, Adi Granov and Warren Ellis are interviewed on the origin, the suits, John Pillinger (the interviewer), and the suit being on a crate, not a briefcase.
 The Extremis storyline serves as the primary source material for the 2013 film Iron Man 3, with characters Maya Hanson and Aldrich Killian being adapted and characters like Mallen being merged with Eric Savin. Although the exact nature of Extremis is subtly changed, the key powers of enhanced strength and fire generation remain, although the enhanced soldiers are not as powerful as Mallen was in the comics, as Tony Stark is able to fight them with remote-controlled armors rather than being required to give himself Extremis to face each one on an equal footing.
 An Extremis soldier appears in the 2021 film Shang-Chi and the Legend of the Ten Rings.

Video games
 Iron Man wears the Extremis suit in Marvel vs. Capcom 3: Fate of Two Worlds, as well as the follow-up Ultimate Marvel vs. Capcom 3.
 The Extremis Suit appears as an optional suit in the Wii and DS versions of the Iron Man 2 video game.
 Extremis soldiers are featured in Iron Man 3: The Official Game.
 Extremis appears in Marvel: Avengers Alliance, as part of Special Operations 9, which involves Iron Man, Rescue, and War Machine fighting off Extremis-enhanced super-soldiers invading Avengers Tower while trying to investigate the source of the project.
 Extremis soldiers appear in Lego Marvel Super Heroes.

Toys
 Hasbro released a 6-inch Marvel Legends Extremis figure and variant blue stealth version in 2012 and a 3.75 inch version in the Marvel Universe toyline. The MU version has been reissued in a comic pack.
 A 6-inch action figure of Iron Man featuring the Extremis armor was released in the first wave of the return of Marvel Legends in 2012 with a blue stealth variant. A re-release of the figure in darker colors was planned for the movie based toy line "Iron Man: Armored Avenger" before the line was cancelled.

Motion comic
In 2010, Marvel Knights Animation adapted Extremis into a motion comic with 3D cel-shading graphics. The six-part mini-series was released by Shout! Factory first on DVD and later coupled with Spider-Woman: Agent Of S.W.O.R.D. on Blu-ray.

Novel
A novel adaption of Iron Man: Extremis, written and adapted by comic writer and editor Marie Javins, was released in May 2013 to tie-in with the release of the Iron Man 3'' film as part of the Marvel Prose Novel series.

References

External links
 
 Extremis at Marvel.com
 

Superhero comics
Nanotechnology in fiction
Marvel Comics adapted into films